William McKelvey (8 July 1934 – 19 October 2016) was a British Labour politician who served as the MP for Kilmarnock from the 1979 to 1983 general election and for Kilmarnock and Loudoun from 1983 until his retirement in 1997 on health grounds.

He was educated at Morgan Academy in Dundee, and Dundee College of Technology (now Abertay University). Before he was elected as an MP he had previously been a member of Dundee District Council, a full-time Labour Party official and a trade union official. He had also worked for NCR in Dundee and served in the Royal Air Force.

He died in October 2016, at the age of 82. Following his death, fellow former Labour MP George Galloway, who also began his political career in Dundee, described McKelvey as his "mentor" and called him "a working-class hero".

References

 Times Guide to the House of Commons, Times Newspapers Limited, 1992 edition.

External links 
 

1934 births
2016 deaths
Amalgamated Engineering Union-sponsored MPs
Scottish Labour MPs
UK MPs 1979–1983
UK MPs 1983–1987
UK MPs 1987–1992
UK MPs 1992–1997
People educated at Morgan Academy
Alumni of Abertay University
Councillors in Dundee